A chess piece, or chessman, is a game piece that is placed on a chessboard to play the game of chess. It can be either white or black, and it can be one of six types: king, queen, rook, bishop, knight, or pawn.

Chess sets generally come with sixteen pieces of each color. Additional pieces, usually an extra queen per color, may be provided for use in promotion.

Number of pieces

Each player begins with sixteen pieces (but see the subsection below for other usage of the term piece).  The pieces that belong to each player are distinguished by color: the lighter colored pieces are referred to as "white" and the player that owns them as "White", whereas the darker colored pieces are referred to as "black" and the player that owns them as "Black".

In a standard game, each of the two players begins with the following sixteen pieces:
 1 king
 1 queen
 2 rooks
 2 bishops
 2 knights
 8 pawns

Usage of the term piece 

The word "piece" has three meanings, depending on the context.
 It may mean any of the physical pieces of the set, including the pawns. When used this way, "piece" is synonymous with "chessman" or simply "man". Chess sets have been made in a variety of styles, sometimes for decorative or artistic purposes rather than practical play, but the Staunton pattern is standard for competition.
 In play, the term is usually used to exclude pawns, referring only to a queen, rook, bishop, knight, or king. In this context, the pieces can be broken down into three groups: major pieces (queen and rooks), minor pieces (bishops and knights), and the king.
 In phrases such as "winning a piece", "losing a piece" or "sacrificing a piece" and other related contexts, it refers only to minor pieces (bishops or knights). By convention, the queen, rooks, and pawns are specified by name in these cases – for example, "winning a queen", "losing a rook", or "sacrificing a pawn".

Moves of the pieces

The rules of chess prescribe the moves each type of chess piece can make. During play, the players take turns moving their own chess pieces.
 The rook may move any number of squares vertically or horizontally without jumping. It also takes part, along with the king, in castling.
 The bishop may move any number of squares diagonally without jumping. Consequently, a bishop stays on squares of the same color throughout the game.
 The queen may move any number of squares vertically, horizontally, or diagonally without jumping.
 The king may move to any adjoining square. No move may be made such that the king is placed or left in check. The king may participate in castling, which is a move consisting of the king moving two squares toward a same-colored rook on the same rank and the rook moving to the square crossed by the king. Castling may only be performed if the king and rook involved are unmoved, if the king is not in check, if the king would not travel through or into check, and if there are no pieces between the rook and the king.
 The knight moves from one corner of any two-by-three rectangle to the opposite corner. Consequently, the knight alternates its square color each time it moves. It is not obstructed by other pieces.
 The pawn may move forward one square, and one or two squares when on its starting square, toward the opponent's side of the board. When there is an enemy piece one square diagonally ahead of a pawn, then the pawn may capture that piece. A pawn can perform a special type of capture of an enemy pawn called en passant ("in passing"), wherein it captures a horizontally adjacent enemy pawn that has just advanced two squares as if that pawn had only advanced one square.

Pieces other than pawns capture in the same way that they move. A capturing piece replaces the opponent piece on its square, except for an en passant capture by a pawn. Captured pieces are immediately removed from the game. A square may hold only one piece at any given time. Except for castling and the knight's move, no piece may jump over another piece.

Relative value

The value assigned to a piece attempts to represent the potential strength of the piece in the game. As the game develops, the relative values of the pieces will also change. Similar ideas apply to placing rooks on open files and knights on active, . The standard valuation is one point for a pawn, three points for a knight or bishop, five points for a rook, and nine points for a queen. These values are reliable in endgames, particularly with a limited number of pieces. But these values can change depending on the position or the phase of the game (opening, middle game, or ending). A  for example, is worth an additional half-pawn on average. In specific circumstances, the values may be quite different: sometimes a knight can be more valuable than a queen if a particular angle is required for a mating attack, such as certain smothered mates. The humble pawn becomes more and more valuable the closer it is to securing a queen promotion for another example.

History

Chess evolved over time from its earliest versions in India and Persia to variants that spread both West and East.  Pieces changed names and rules as well; the most notable changes was the Vizir (or Firz) becoming the Queen, and the Elephant becoming the Bishop in European versions of chess.  The movement patterns for Queens and Bishops also changed, with the earliest rules restricting elephants to just two squares along a diagonal, but allowing them to "jump" (seen in the fairy chess piece the alfil); and the earliest versions of queens could only move a single square diagonally (the fairy chess piece Ferz).  The modern bishop's movement was popularized in the 14th and 15th centuries, and the modern queen was popularized in the 15th and 16th centuries, with versions with the more powerful modern queen eclipsing older variants.

Piece names

The characters implied by pieces' names vary between languages. For example, in many languages, the piece known in English as the "knight" frequently translates as "horse", and the English "bishop" frequently translates as "elephant" in language areas that adapted the modern bishop's movement pattern, but not its new name.

Variant pieces

Chess variants sometimes include new, non-standard, or even old pieces.  For example, Courier Chess, a predecessor of modern chess dating from the 12th century, was played on an 8×12 board and used all six modern chess piece types, plus three additional types of pieces: Courier, Mann (or rath or sage), and Jester.  Variants of "old" chess might use the old rules for bishops/elephants with the alfil piece, or old rules for Queens with the ferz.  Many modern variants with unorthodox pieces exist, such as Berolina chess which uses custom pawns that advance diagonally and capture vertically.

See also

 Chess set
 Chessboard
 Chess piece relative value
 Chess symbols in Unicode
 Fairy chess piece – a piece used only in chess variants
 History of chess
 Lewis chessmen
 Outline of chess
 Rules of chess
 Staunton chess set

Notes

References

External links

 FIDE on chess equipment
 History of Staunton Chess Pieces
 Chess pieces in different languages
 Online "Chess Museum" with many historic examples
 How chess pieces are made and constructed
 DIY: How to make a wooden chess pieces 

 
Chess sets